J. J. Manissadjian (1862–1942) was a botanist who lived in the Ottoman Empire. Manissadijan left the Ottoman Empire after its collapse and emigrated to the United States.

Life
His mother, Katharina "Katherine" Margarete Barbara Klein, was German and his father, Barsam J Manissadjian, was Armenian. He went to Germany in order to study natural history at the Humboldt University at Berlin. In 1890, he became Professor of Botany at the American Anatolia College in Marsovan (also spelled Mersiwan) in Paphlagonia in Northeastern Anatolia, where he founded a museum.

Manissadijan started collected plants from the Black Sea region of the Ottoman Empire. He discovered several new species of bulbous plants that were later published by the Austrian Botanist Josef Franz Freyn.

In 1893, he wrote Lehrbücher des Seminars für Orientalische Sprachen zu Berlin Band 11: Mürsid-i lisan-y 'Osmani. Lehrbuch der modernen osmanischen Sprache, it has been reprinted many times.

By 1894, he had supplied commercial gardeners in the Netherland, foremost Van Tubergen, with plant material from the Pontus region. Among those were bulbs of the now locally extinct Sprenger's tulip from the Amasya region, and Allium tubergeni Freyn.

He sold other rare plants, like Iris gatesii to Dutch commercial gardeners. Obviously, too many bulbs were taken from the wild, and the plant became extinct.

The museum-library of Merzifon was constructed between 1910 and 1911.

He survived the Armenian genocide (between 1915–1918) during the period of the First World War, as his mother was German, but he was arrested in late June 1915, and was then imprisoned by Ottoman forces.

Manissadjian and his family was later released after American missionaries (from the college) paid a bribe to the local gendarmes. They were relocated to Amasya in an agricultural unit which was managed by Germans.

In 1917, he was allowed to explore and started creating a collection of specimens for the college, it ranged from shells, corals, minerals, plants to animals and birds. Manissadjian's collection was illustrated in the Catalogue of the Museum of Anatolia College which was handwritten by Manissadjian. It covered roughly 7,000 specimens.

The college closed in Merzifon and then reopened in Thessaloniki, Greece in 1924, as Anatolia College. The college museum closed in 1939, and then 130 of Manissadjian's plants went sent to the Herbarium of Ankara University, Faculty of Science.

He was married to Arousyag Sara Eunice Daglian (1868–1948).

He eventually fled to Detroit, USA where he later died in 1942.

Species
Species named after Manissadijan include:
 Colchicum manissadjianii  (Azn.) K.Perss.
 Iris manissadijani Freyn, now a synonym of Iris sari
 Merenda manissadijani

References

Other sources
 Brian Mathew, Turhan Baytop 1984. The bulbous Plants of Turkey. London, Batsford, p. 12.
 J. Freyn 1894. Plantae novae Orientates. Österreichische botanische Zeitschrift, 324–327.
 A Portrait of Manissadijan is published in Brian Mathew, Turhan Baytop 1984. The bulbous Plants of Turkey. London, Batsford, Pl. 12.

19th-century botanists
1862 births
1942 deaths
Humboldt University of Berlin alumni
Scientists from the Ottoman Empire